Mazlum Kayalar (1911 – 3 February 1972) wss a Turkish politician.

He was born in Kayılar district in Macedonia.

He is a graduate of Istanbul University Faculty of Law. Bursa Judge's Office, Çanakkale Deputy General Manager, Ministry of Finance Consultant Advocate, Free Lawyer,

He  was a member of the Grand National Assembly of Turkey representing the Democrat Party under Adnan Menderes. 

He is married and has two children

References

Deputies of Bursa
1911 births
1972 deaths
Democrat Party (Turkey, 1946–1961) politicians
20th-century Turkish politicians
Istanbul University Faculty of Law alumni